The split jack, sometimes called as the split jumping jack, is a form of a warmup exercise and may be regarded as a variation of the traditional jumping jack. It is similar to the split jump; however, in the latter, the arms do not move and stay stationary at the sides of the torso.

Execution
The split jack is performed, according to Adam Campbell's The Men's Health Big Book of Exercises and The Women's Health Big Book of Exercises, by first standing in a staggered stance, while having the right foot in front of the left foot.  Then the actual jumps are done while swinging an arm that is opposite to the jumping foot, switching legs throughout the process.

References

Aerobic exercise